Arak (Ərak) is a rural locality (a selo) and the administrative centre of Araksky Selsoviet, Tabasaransky District, Republic of Dagestan, Russia. The population was 464 as of 2010. There are 4 streets.

Geography 
It is located 12 km southwest of Khuchni. Novoye Lidzhe is the nearest rural locality.

References 

Rural localities in Tabasaransky District